Villanova is a name of Latin origin, meaning new town. It is equivalent to Italian Villanuova, French Villeneuve, Spanish Villanueva, and  Catalan, Galician, Occitan and Portuguese Vilanova. It may refer to:

Botany
Villanova, a genus of plants in the family Phyllanthaceae, an illegitimate name replaced by Flueggea (bushweed)
Villanova (plant), a genus of plants in the family Asteraceae

Education
Villanova University, an American university established in 1842 in Pennsylvania, by the Augustinian Order (formerly known as Villanova College)
Villanova Wildcats, the athletic program of Villanova University
St. Thomas of Villanova College, an Augustinian university preparatory school in King City, Ontario, Canada
Villanova College (Australia), a current school run by the Augustinian priests, located in Coorparoo, in Brisbane, Queensland
Villanova Preparatory School, a college preparatory school in Ojai, California

Geography and history
Villanova, Pennsylvania, a neighborhood in the suburbs of Philadelphia
Villanova (SEPTA Regional Rail station), the station on Philadelphia's SEPTA Regional Rail Paoli/Thorndale Line
Villanova d'Asti, a town in the Province of Asti, Piedmont, Italy
Villanova Monferrato, a town in the Province of Alessandria, Piedmont, Italy
 Villanova Monteleone, a comune (municipality) in the Province of Sassari in the Italian region Sardinia
 Villanova Tulo, a comune (municipality) in the Province of Cagliari in the Italian region Sardinia
Villanova Canavese, a town in the Metropolitan city of Turin, Piedmont, Italy
Villanova, a frazione in the municipality of Bagnacavallo, province of Ravenna, Emilia-Romagna, Italy
Villanova, a frazione in the municipality of Castenaso, province of Bologna, Emilia-Romagna, Italy
Villanovan Culture, the predecessor to the Etruscan civilization culture, named after the frazione of Castenaso
Villanova, a frazione in the municipality of Ostuni, Puglia, in Italy
Villanova, Corse-du-Sud, a commune of the Arrondissement of Ajaccio in Corsica
Vilanova de Arousa, a town in the Province of Pontevedra, Galicia, Spain
Villanova, Huesca, a municipality in Huesca (province), Spain
Villanova, Ribagorza (AKA Vilanova d'Éssera), a village in the autonomous community of Aragon, Spain

Literature
Villanova (short story), a 2002 short story by John Hodgman

Names
Arnaldus de Villa Nova  (c. 1235–1313), alchemist, astrologer, and physician
Saint Thomas of Villanova (born Tomás García Martínez, 1488–1555), Spanish Augustinian friar and archbishop

See also
Vila Nova (disambiguation)
Villa Nova (disambiguation)
Vilanova (disambiguation)
Villanova College (disambiguation)
Villanueva (disambiguation)
Villeneuve (disambiguation)